The Dean Forest (Encroachments) Act 1838 (1 & 2 Vict c 42) was an Act of the Parliament of the United Kingdom.

The whole Act, so far as unrepealed, was repealed by section 1(4) of, and the Schedule to, the Wild Creatures and Forest Laws Act 1971.

See also
English land law
Dean Forest Act 1819
Dean Forest Act 1667
Dean Forest Act 1842
Dean Forest Act 1861

References

United Kingdom Acts of Parliament 1838
English forest law
Forest of Dean
19th century in Gloucestershire